= Kakavedu =

Coordinates: 13°20′N 79°36′E

Kakavedu is a village located in Chittoor District, Andhra Pradesh, India. It falls under Nagari Mandal. It has a population of 2622 members, includes 1311 women and 1311 men. The main agricultural crops of Kakavedu village are rice and sugarcane. Total area of Kakavedu is 817 hectares. Local language spoke is Telugu. The festivals celebrated are kollaparamma tirunallu, gangamma jatara.
